Collinwood Mansion is a fictional house featured in the Gothic horror soap opera Dark Shadows (1966–1971). Built in 1795 by Joshua Collins, Collinwood has been home to the Collins family and other sometimes unwelcome supernatural visitors since its inception. The house is located near the town of Collinsport, Maine, overlooking the Atlantic Ocean. Almost every resident of the town is too scared to even drive by the house due to rumours and legends. The house has more than 40 rooms, most of which are closed off due to lack of inhabitants and financial reasons, and more than a few secret passageways, including a room that is a gateway to a parallel timeline, a stairway through time, and one room that appears to be a playroom to some and nothing more than a linen closet to others. Most of the household activity is centered in the drawing room and foyer, and sometimes the kitchen, dining room, and study. Collinwood is notorious for causing unrest and frustration among both residents and visitors, likely due to its ominous atmosphere and mysterious past. Despite its unsettling reputation, the allure of the grand estate continues to draw intrigue and curiosity from those brave enough to explore its halls. It has been the scene of much death, random violence, and other misfortune. In many episodes of the series, most local characters find it easier to just avoid it and the Collins family altogether.

Interior
The house had three main sections to it — the central area that was still in use, and an east wing and west wing that were generally closed off and unused.  The following rooms appeared on-screen throughout the run of the original series:

Foyer and main drawing room — This was the principal setting for much of the series.  A grand stairway and mezzanine overlooks the foyer and lead to the second floor.  The parlor had large bay windows that overlooked the ocean.  The paneling on the back wall contained the entrance to a secret passage that led to Quentin Collins' west wing study.  Several portraits of Collins family ancestors hang around the parlor and foyer — most significantly a portrait of Barnabas Collins from 1795 that hangs in an alcove by the main entrance.

Bedrooms — There are ten second-floor rooms in addition to servants' quarters in the back of the first floor.  The two most often depicted were David Collins' room, and Victoria Winters' (David's governess') room.   Both rooms were in the same hallway, with a door that led to the west wing (normally kept locked).

Basement — Used for storage.  It was chiefly noteworthy because one locked room, a wine cellar, was supposedly used as a makeshift grave for Paul Stoddard, Elizabeth's husband.  (In reality, he wasn't actually buried there, and was very much alive.  Paul's shifty friend Jason McGuire convinced a hysterical Liz that she had murdered him, and that he buried the body there.)

Breakfast room — This room was shown only occasionally in the first year of the show. In one scene, early in the morning, Roger Collins walks out the door to the terrace and stretches. In the real life house used for the exteriors, Roger just walked out of the actual breakfast room.

Study — Located off the foyer, next to the parlor.  It was only occasionally seen, but was used to house the 'remains' of Victoria after she was hanged in 1796 (although she was really not dead but placed in suspended animation by Angelique).

West Wing room — A large study filled with old papers.  This is the scene for one of the series' first supernatural occurrences when David pulls a mean prank by locking Victoria in, trapping her there all night.  The ghost of the recently murdered Bill Malloy appeared to her.

Garden terrace — Located just outside the foyer was the terrace.  It has a water fountain, a small plaza and a gazebo.

Tower room — Structurally, the house was constructed around a large central tower that contained an attic room.  In 1796, this room was used temporarily to house Barnabas Collins' coffin.  In 1897, Judith Collins Trask housed the crazed Jenny (wife of Quentin) there.

Quentin Collins' study — A large private study used by Quentin in 1897.  Judith Collins, Quentin's elder sister, had the entrance sealed up with her murderous husband, the Reverend Trask within.  In 1968, David Collins and Amy Jennings discover a hole in the wall that leads to the room.  In there, they find what they take to be Quentin's skeletal remains. The two children then encounter and become possessed by the spirits of Quentin and Beth Chavez.

Parallel Time room — One of the strangest rooms in the house, this grand bedroom suite was a conduit to an alternate reality.  Normally it was one more unused east wing room.  However, when viewing it from outside the doorway, characters could see the Collins family members of another world.  In that other Collinwood, the room was the private quarters of Angelique, who was the first wife of Quentin (the lord of the manor in this reality) and mother of Daniel (David).  The inhabitants of that other reality were unaware that they were being observed (although Angelique and a few other Parallel Time characters saw into the “normal time” counterpart room occasionally).  An invisible barrier usually kept the two worlds separate, but Barnabas and Julia were both able to pierce it.  When a fire destroyed the Parallel Time Collinwood, the gateway to that other world was (presumably) broken for good.  However, in 1840, Daphne Harridge "discovered" it as well, and Lamar Trask pierced the barrier just before dying.

Playroom and stairway through time — In 1840, a particular room was used as a playroom for children.  In 1970, the same room was used as a linen closet.  Yet behind the room was a stairwell that the 1840 Quentin Collins placed an enchantment on.  Quentin, a student of magical arts, constructed the stairway using magical means to make it ascend through time into the future.  He believed his experiment was a failure, but actually succeeded.  Barnabas and Julia used the stairway to travel back from 1995 to 1970.  Later, Julia (and later still Prof. Stokes) used the stairwell to travel from 1970 to 1840.  After Barnabas, Julia and Prof. Stokes used the stairwell one last time to get back to 1970, Desmond Collins destroyed it.

Additionally, the 1970 film House of Dark Shadows included scenes set in a terrarium (in scenes cut from the theatrical release) and a swimming pool, but these were never shown in the original series.

Estate
Collinwood mansion is the largest and most prominent building on a vast estate that shares the same name as the house. Although the Collinwood mansion was built in 1795, the Collins family has lived on the estate grounds since colonial times in other dwellings.

Old House
This was the first large house built by the Collins family. It was known as Collinwood before the larger house was built. Although not as big as Collinwood, it is large. When Joshua built the new house, he intended to bequeath the Old House to his son Barnabas as a wedding gift. After Barnabas' "death", the house was abandoned. It was inhabited for a time in the 1890s by a gypsy couple, Sandor and Magda Rakosi, but by 1966, it had been vacant for decades and had fallen into ruin. A large, framed portrait of Josette Collins (née du Pres) hung in the parlor and in modern times, her spirit would emerge from it and dance around the porch. When Barnabas was released from his coffin in 1967, he renovated and inhabited the house (which at the time had no electricity, heat or plumbing). He kept his coffin in the basement, which also included a dungeon room that he used to imprison Maggie Evans (but turned out to have a secret escape passage to a cavern on the seashore). Julia installed a generator and conducted scientific experiments there — including her attempted cure for vampirism, and the creation of Eve. Barnabas still inhabited the Old House in 1971, at the series' end.

Caretaker's Cottage
When first seen, it was inhabited by Matthew Morgan (the estate handyman who murdered Bill Malloy). Later inhabitants were Laura Collins (during her 1966–1967 appearances on the show) and then Chris Jennings in 1968-1970. In the 1897 storyline, one night at the cottage, Quentin Collins, Evan Handley and Jamison Collins resurrected Angelique. Later inhabitants were Laura Collins. In 1840, Roxanne Drew lived there until her death by Angelique.

Coach House
A small property located on the estate where Jeb Hawkes lived in 1970.

Seaside shack
Only briefly seen, this is a hut located near the shore of the ocean.  Laura Collins lured her son David there in order to immolate both him and herself. (She hoped to extend her "immortal phoenix" ability to him, thereby giving him eternal life.)  After the cottage burned down it was apparently not restored.

Seaview
An unused property located on the border of the estate is also known as 'The House By The Sea'. The house contained a large empty parlor and a small hallway to the front door. Seaview was a -story Cape Cod style house c. 1700s (see episode 294). Its primitive parlor set was previously used as part of Roger's office at the cannery, and later Barnabas' bedroom in 1795 (including his fireplace at stage right). The last member of the family to live in the house—one Caleb Collins—had a morbid fear of strangers, and made a provision in his will that it cannot be sold to someone outside the Collins family for 100 years. A stipulation that prevented Burke Devlin from purchasing the property in 1967. Later that year, warlock Nicholas Blair took up residence at the property.

Some fans confuse Blair House with Seaview, as it too was described as a house by the sea, owned by the Collins family.  Blair House (549) was a three-story wooden shingled beach house in the Dutch Colonial style, with a tall gambrel roof covering most of the second and third floors. It was perched on a steep sandy hill apparently overlooking the beach, with balconies at second and third levels and a large porch across the ground floor.  It had a spiral staircase down to its basement.  In episode 550 Vicki tells Stokes that Cassandra's brother has "taken one of the Collins' houses, the one by the ocean. He intends to go on living here." In episode 559, Nicholas tells Maggie that he has leased "a house by the sea" belonging to the Collins family.

Elizabeth Stoddard's Mausoleum
While she was masquerading as Cassandra, Angelique placed a curse upon Elizabeth causing her to be obsessed with the notion of being buried alive.  Elizabeth had a special tomb constructed with a bell so that if she should happen to be accidentally interred alive (as she was, sure enough), she would be able to summon help.

Woods
Collinwood estate has a vast wild forest growing on it.  Quite naturally, it is the site of numerous encounters with the supernatural — Elizabeth was almost attacked by the werewolf Chris Jennings there, and a headless corpse attacked and killed a servant woman in 1840.

Widow's Hill
Although perhaps not officially a part of the estate, Widow's Hill is adjacent to it. This is a dramatic cliff that overlooks the ocean; it was given the name because the widows of sailors who were lost at sea would gather there to wail for their dead husbands. Their ghosts haunted the hilltop and were known as "the Wailing Women."  Josette famously leaped to her death there, and Jeb Hawkes also died from a fall there (as did, supposedly, Victoria Winters, after being driven mad by the Leviathans, but this was related second-hand and not actually shown on-screen).

Television and film locations

The 1966–1971 series Dark Shadows used the exteriors of Seaview Terrace in Newport, Rhode Island, later known as Carey Mansion, as Collinwood. Lyndhurst Mansion in Tarrytown, New York was used for the films House of Dark Shadows (1970) and Night of Dark Shadows (1971). Some interior scenes of House of Dark Shadows were shot at the Lockwood–Mathews Mansion in Norwalk, Connecticut. Greystone Mansion in Beverly Hills, California was used as Collinwood in the 1991 revival series and The WB's 2004 pilot.

See also
 Dark Shadows
 House of Dark Shadows
 Night of Dark Shadows

References

External
 

Dark Shadows
Fictional houses